Angela McCluskey (born 28 February 1967) is a Scottish singer-songwriter based in California. She performs as a solo artist and as a member of the folk rock group Wild Colonials. McCluskey has also provided vocals for Curio and recorded the European dance hit and US Mitsubishi commercial hit "Breathe" among other songs with Télépopmusik (on albums Genetic World and Angel Milk). Angela also sang "Beautiful Things" for American Express and more recently her voice can be heard on the Schick Quattro commercial singing "I’m Not the Girl". Her songs have appeared on the soundtracks for the films Rachel Getting Married, Sherrybaby, The Beat That My Heart Skipped. Her music has also been featured in the TV series Grey's Anatomy.

Biography
Angela McCluskey was born in Glasgow, Scotland on 28 February 1967. She went to London and found work as a publicist, and then in the video department of EMI Records. In 1993, she relocated to Hollywood, California.

She is married to composer Paul Cantelon, whom she met in about 1992 in London where he was playing piano in a restaurant.

In Los Angeles in 1993, McCluskey and her friend Shark formed a band called Wild Colonials. Two albums, Fruit of Life (1994) and This Can't Be Life (1996), were followed by performances at 1997's Lilith Fair road show. During this period, Angela McCluskey worked with Dr. John, Cyndi Lauper, Deep Forest, Joe Henry, The The, Triptych, and Télépopmusik.

In 2003, McCluskey and Télépopmusik collaborated on a song titled "Breathe." The song was a transatlantic hit, entering the US Billboard Hot 100 and peaking in the Top 50 on the UK Singles chart. McCluskey collaborated with the group on several of the songs on their debut album, "Genetic World," and also lent her vocals to several songs on the group's 2005 follow-up, "Angel Milk."

In 2004, Angela McCluskey released her debut solo album The Things We Do on Manhattan Records/ Blue Note. The record was written and recorded in Manhattan and Sweden. It was produced by Shudder to Think's Nathan Larson.

In 2007, Bruce Weber featured McCluskey and her husband, Paul Cantelon, in the short film "Wine and Cupcakes" where the couple romps through Central Park while McCluskey does a spoken word voice-over of the song, If I Ruled the World, and then she sings Autumn in New York.

In 2009, McCluskey released her second solo album, "You Could Start a Fight in an Empty House", including the track "Handle with Grace" (featuring Télépopmusik).

In 2011, McCluskey performed her three-person show Catch a Falling Star in New York while also performing at Carnegie Hall. Angela also appears as a featured vocalist on Robbie Robertson's album "How to Become Clairvoyant". She also achieved a chart-topping hit that year with "In the Air", her collaboration with Morgan Page, which went to No. 1 on the Billboard Dance Airplay Chart. McCluskey's third solo record, Lambeth Palace, was released in 2012 and featured collaborations with Morgan Page, Ambrosia Parsley, and Richard Fortus. She also sang on "Stargazing", a collaboration with Delerium featured on their album Music Box Opera. The following year, Angela McCluskey released XIX with duo Christian Rich and also We Are the Future with Andy Caldwell (released on Nettwerk). In 2016, she sang on a song by Big Gigantic titled "Little Things." The group stated that they had heard a song on Pandora by Telepopmusik featuring McCluskey's vocals, which caught their attention.

Discography
 The Things We Do (Manhattan/Blue Note, 2004)
 Angela McCluskey EP (2004)
 You Could Start a Fight in an Empty House (Bernadette, 2009)
 Handle with Grace EP (Bernadette, 2010)
 Here Comes the Sun (Bernadette, 2011)
 Lambeth Palace (EP) (Believe, 2012)
 The Roxy Sessions (Bernadette, 2016)

with The Garden of Eden
 The Garden of Eden (1988)

with Wild Colonials
 Fruit of Life (1994)
 This Can’t Be Life (1996)
 Reel Life, Vol. 1 (2000)
 Life As We Know It EP 1/4 (2007)

with TélépopmusikGenetic World (2001)
"Breathe"
"Smile"
"Love Can Damage Your Health"
"Yesterday Was a Lie"Angel Milk (2005)
"Don't Look Back"
"Love's Almighty"
"Brighton Beach"
"Nothing's Burning"

As a featured artist
 Deep Forest - "Will You Be Ready ft. Angela McCluskey and Chitose Hajime" on Music Detected (2002)
 Parov Stelar - "Parov Stelar feat. Angela McCluskey - Don't Believe What They Say" on The Demon Diaries (2015)
 Kendrick Lamar - "Is It Love ft. Angela McCluskey" on The Kendrick Lamar EP (2009)
 Morgan Page – Tell Me Why (2010)
 Robbie Robertson – "When the Night Was Young" on How to Be Clairvoyant Morgan Page, Sultan & Ned Shepard and BT – In the Air (Nettwerk, 2012)
 Delerium – "Stargazing" on Music Box Opera (Nettwerk, 2012)
 Angela McCluskey & Christian Rich – "XIX" (2012)
 Andy Caldwell – "We Are the Future" (Nettwerk)
 Maor Levi ft. Angela McCluskey - Pick Up The Pieces
 Paul Oakenfold feat. Angela McCluskey - You Could Be Happy
 Azealia Banks - "Ice Princess" (uncredited chorus vocals)
 Christian Rich - "Real Love" FW14 (2015)
 Big Gigantic - "The Little Things" (2 March 2016)

References

External links

 http://www.angelamccluskey.com
 Weber's short film, Wine and Cupcakes'', 2007

Living people
21st-century Scottish women singers
Scottish pop singers
Scottish singer-songwriters
British emigrants to the United States
Women rock singers
Musicians from Glasgow
Musicians from Los Angeles
1967 births